"You Can Have Her" is a song written by Bill Cook. The song was a hit single for Roy Hamilton in 1961 and Sam Neely in 1974.  It has also been recorded by many other artists, including Jerry Lee Lewis, Charlie Rich, Waylon Jennings, and Jim Ed Brown. Elvis Presley performed an impromptu version at his Inglewood Forum, LA, Afternoon Show on the 11th May 1974.

In 1961, Roy Hamilton's version spent 10 weeks on the Billboard Hot 100, reaching No. 12, while reaching No. 6 on Billboards Hot R&B Sides chart.

A 1965 version by The Righteous Brothers reached #67 on the singles chart.
In 1961 Dalida and Johnny Hallyday had a French version of this song: "Tu peux le/la prendre".

With lyrics in Swedish by Stig Anderson using the Stig Rossner pseudonym, the song was recorded by Swedish actress and recording artist Anita Lindblom. in English, Swedish ("Sån't är livet"), and German ("Laß die Liebe aus dem Spiel") and was released as a single in October 1961.

"Sån't är livet" became Lindblom's big break in Sweden, it topped the Swedish charts for several weeks and sold more than 150,000 copies. She also performed the song in the 1961 film Vi fixar allt.

The single charted at the Norwegian VG chart for 22 weeks in 1962 topping the chart for seven weeks.

Anne-Lie Rydé recorded the song on the 1992 cover album Stulna kyssar.

In popular culture
The song appears in the 2010 video game Mafia II.

References

1961 songs
Number-one singles in Norway
Roy Hamilton songs
Anita Lindblom songs
Anne-Lie Rydé songs
Elvis Presley songs